Austin Belknap (July 18, 1819 – December 9, 1902) was a Massachusetts businessman and politician who served as a member, and last Chairman, of the Board of Selectmen of Somerville, Massachusetts, and as the third Mayor, of Somerville.

Early life
Belknap was born July 18, 1819, in Westboro, Massachusetts, to John and Ruth (Fay) Belknap of Westboro.

Notes

1819 births
1902 deaths
American civil engineers
Mayors of Somerville, Massachusetts
People from Westborough, Massachusetts